Susan Mary Woodford-Hollick, Baroness Hollick OBE (born 16 May 1945) is a British businesswoman and consultant with a wide-ranging involvement in broadcasting and the arts. A former investigative journalist, she worked for many years in television (as Sue Woodford), where her roles included producer/director of World in Action for Granada TV and founding commissioning editor of Multicultural Programmes for Channel Four. As a campaigner for human rights, world health, literacy, and the arts, she serves as trustee or patron of a range of charities and foundations. She is founder and co-director of Bringing up Baby Ltd, a childcare company. Other causes and organisations with which she is associated include the African Medical and Research Foundation (AMREF), the Leader's Quest Foundation, Complicite theatre company, Reprieve, the Free Word Centre. the Runnymede Trust and the SI Leeds Literary Prize. Of English and Trinidadian heritage, she is the wife of Clive Hollick, Baron Hollick, with whom she has three daughters.

Biography

Early years
Sue Woodford-Hollick was educated at the University of Sussex and is the daughter of Ulric Cross, a former High Court judge in Trinidad, Trinidadian High Commissioner to London (1990–93) and much-decorated RAF squadron leader in World War II. On BBC Woman's Hour on 8 August 2012, in the feature "Family Secrets" for which she was interviewed by her daughter Abigail, Woodford-Hollick spoke about growing up believing that she had been adopted by the white parents she knew as "Auntie May and Uncle Dick", only to discover in her twenties that her natural father was a Caribbean war hero and that her much older "sister" was in fact her mother, who had been forced to marry someone else: "Illegitimacy was not accepted in those days, and prejudice against black people was rife everywhere." Woodford-Hollick contributed the memoir "Who I Was Then and Who I Am Now" to the 2019 anthology New Daughters of Africa, edited by Margaret Busby.

Career
In 1969, she joined Granada Television in Manchester as a newsreader and presenter/reporter on the regional news magazine programme, and she went on to become one of the few women to produce/direct the flagship current affairs programme World in Action. 

In 1981, she joined Channel 4 Television as the first Commissioning Editor for multi-cultural programming, one of the priorities of the new channel, where she commissioned a range of programmes to reflect the diversity of Britain's minority ethnic communities. Her work at Channel 4 has been described by Farrukh Dhondy as "revolutionary": "She ditched the mission to complain and ran on the channel, among a diversity of offerings, one West Indian and one Asian magazine show, a black arts showcase programme and then a situation comedy called No Problem, co-written by veteran Trinidadian playwright Mustafa Matura and myself. The brief to the writers was clear – a situation comedy makes people laugh.... Under Sue Woodford the mission to complain was subverted. There were two clear strategic objectives which emerged from Channel 4. More people from the ethnic communities should be making programmes, serving an apprenticeship if necessary. There were, inevitably headcounts of the number of ethnic faces appeared on-screen as newsreaders, reporters, presenters or actors. A fair volume of programming of diverse sorts would ensure or at least begin the assimilation of the new communities into the nation's primary instrument or mirror of self-awareness."

Consultancy and voluntary work
She has been involved throughout her life with many campaigns for human rights and diversity. Between 1993 and 2000 she chaired  Index on Censorship, the international magazine for free speech, of which she remains a patron.

In September 2000, she succeeded Trevor Phillips as Chair of the London Arts Board, and on the creation of a single funding body for the arts in England, Woodford-Hollick was appointed in 2002 to the national council of the new organisation, Arts Council England (ACE), and to chair its London regional council, which she did for seven years. 

She has been an adviser on Caribbean affairs to the Foreign and Commonwealth Office (FCO), and in 1998 she served on the Commission on the Future of Multi-Ethnic Britain, an independent inquiry set up by the Runnymede Trust and chaired by Lord Parekh. She has also served on the boards of a wide range of organisations, including Talawa Theatre Company, the Theatre Museum, Tate Members, the Royal Commonwealth Society Contemporary Dance Trust, the English National Opera and the University of Westminster.

She is currently a trustee of the African Medical and Research Foundation (AMREF), Africa's largest health NGO, based in Nairobi, Kenya. She chairs the Leader's Quest Foundation and is a trustee of Complicite theatre company and of Reprieve. She is also a patron of the Runnymede Trust and a trustee of the Free Word Centre. In addition, she is a patron of the SI Leeds Literary Prize, an award for unpublished fiction for Black and Asian women in the UK.

In April 2012, in Port of Spain, Trinidad, she announced the inauguration of the Hollick Arvon Caribbean Writers Prize, sponsored by the Hollick Family Charitable Trust and the Arvon Foundation, in association with the NGC Bocas Lit Fest, an award to allow a Caribbean writer living in the Anglophone region and writing in English, and who has not yet published a full-length book, to devote time to advancing a work in progress.

She was named as one of the supporters of the Women's Prize for Fiction 2013.

She is a trustee of the foundation announced in December 2014 in memory of cultural theorist Stuart Hall.

Family
She is married to the businessman Clive Hollick, Baron Hollick, with whom she has three daughters: Caroline, Georgina and Abigail.

Honours and awards
She was appointed Officer of the Order of the British Empire (OBE) in the 2011 Birthday Honours for services to the arts. She is an Honorary Fellow of the University of Westminster and a Fellow of the Royal Society of Arts.

She is regularly included on the Power List of "Britain's 100 Most Influential Black People".

In January 2018 she received an honorary doctorate from the University of Sussex.

References

External links
  Lady Sue Woodford-Hollick by Women of the Year, 30 July 2012.
 "Susan Mary Woodford-Hollick, Lady Hollick (1945–), Arts administrator", National Portrait Gallery.

1945 births
Alumni of the University of Sussex
British baronesses
British businesspeople
British people of Trinidad and Tobago descent
Channel 4 people
Fellows of Merton College, Oxford
Living people
Officers of the Order of the British Empire
Place of birth missing (living people)
Spouses of life peers